The orbital lamina of ethmoid bone, (or lamina papyracea or orbital lamina) is a smooth, oblong bone plate which forms the lateral surface of the labyrinth of the ethmoid bone in the skull. 
The plate covers in the middle and posterior ethmoidal cells and forms a large part of the medial wall of the orbit.

It articulates above with the orbital plate of the frontal bone, below with the maxilla and the orbital process of palatine bone, in front with the lacrimal, and behind with the sphenoid.

Its name lamina papyracea is an appropriate description, as this part of the ethmoid bone is paper-thin and fractures easily. A fracture here could cause entrapment of the medial rectus muscle.

Additional Images

References

External links
  - "Orbits and Eye: Bones"
 

Bones of the head and neck